The Expulsion of the Moriscos was decreed by King Philip III of Spain on April 9, 1609. The Moriscos were descendants of Spain's Muslim population who had been forced to convert to Christianity. Since the Spanish were fighting wars in the Americas, feeling threatened by the Turks raiding along the Spanish coast and by two Morisco revolts in the century since Islam was outlawed in Spain, it seems that the expulsions were a reaction to an internal problem of the stretched Spanish Empire. Between 1609 through 1614, the Crown systematically expelled Moriscos through a number of decrees affecting Spain's various kingdoms, with varying levels of success.

Although initial estimates of the number expelled such as those of Henri Lapeyre range between 275,000 and 300,000 Moriscos (or 4% of the total Spanish population), the extent and actual success of the expulsion order in purging Spain of its Moriscos has been increasingly challenged by modern historians, starting with the seminal studies carried out by François Martinez (1999) and Trevor J. Dadson (2007). Dadson estimates that, out of a total Morisco population of 500,000, a figure accepted by many, around 40% avoided expulsion altogether and tens of thousands of those expelled managed to return. 

The places where the expulsion was particularly successful were the eastern Kingdom of Valencia, where Muslims represented the bulk of the peasantry and ethnic tension with the Christian, Catalan-speaking middle class was high; as a result, this region implemented the expulsion most severely and successfully, leading to the economic collapse and depopulation of much of its territory, worsened by the bubonic plague which hit Valencia only a few years later. The Kingdom of Aragon was, after Valencia, the part of the peninsula with the largest rate of expelled Moriscos and suffered the consequences as disastrously as Valencia, according to Henri Lapeyre.

Of those permanently expelled, the majority eventually settled in the Barbary Coast (Maghreb), with around 30,000 to 75,000 people ultimately returning to Spain. Those who avoided expulsion or who managed to return to Spain merged into the dominant culture. The last mass prosecution against Moriscos for crypto-Islamic practices took place in Granada in 1727, with most of those convicted receiving relatively light sentences. By the end of the 18th century, indigenous Islam and Morisco identity were considered to have been extinguished in Spain.

Background

Suspicions and tensions between Moriscos, who were called New Christians, and the other Christians, who were called Old Christians, were high in some parts of Spain but practically nonexistent in others. While some Moriscos did hold influence and power, and even had positions in the clergy, others, particularly in Valencia and Aragon, were a source of cheap labour for the local aristocracy. Where sectarian conflict existed, Old Christian communities suspected the Moriscos of not being sincere in their Christianity. The Moors who remained Muslims were known as Mudéjar. Many of the Moriscos, in contrast, were devout in their new Christian faith, and in Granada, many Moriscos even became Christian martyrs, and were killed by Muslims for refusing to renounce Christianity. Much of the enmity between the Old and New Christians was based on ethnicity rather than religion.

Several revolts broke out, the most notable being the 1568–1573 revolt against an edict of Phillip II's banning Arabic, Arabic names, and requiring Moriscos to give up their children to be educated by priests. After the suppression of the revolt, Philip ordered the dispersal of the Moriscos of Granada to other areas. Philip expected that this would break down the Morisco community and facilitate their assimilation into the rest of the Christian population. This may have happened to a degree to Granada's Moriscos, but not in Valencia or Aragon, where Islam was still widely practised and ethnic tensions were much higher than in the rest of Spain.

At around the same time, Spain recognized the loss of more than half of its holdings in the Low Countries to the Protestant Dutch Republic. The ruling class already thought of Spain as the defender of Catholic Christendom, and this defeat helped lead to a radicalization of thinking and a desire to strike a blow to regain Spain's honor. Some critiques of Spain from Protestant countries included insults of the Spanish as corrupted by the Muslims and crypto-Muslims amongst them, which some of the nobility may have taken personally.

The situation further deteriorated in the early 17th century. A recession struck in 1604 as the amount of gold and treasure from Spain's American holdings fell. The reduction in the standard of living led to increased tension between the Moriscos and Old Christians for precious jobs.

Attitudes toward the Moriscos by region
The number of Moriscos in Spain at the time of expulsion is unknown and most estimates are based on the numbers of Moriscos who were expelled. Figures of between 300,000 and 400,000 are often cited. However, modern studies estimate between 500,000 and one million Moriscos present in Spain at the beginning of the 17th century out of a total population of 8.5 million.
A significant proportion resided in the former Crown of Aragon, where it is estimated they constituted a fifth of the population, and the Valencia area specifically, where they were a third of the total population. The rich and those who lived in the cities were mostly Christians, while the Moriscos occupied the outlying countryside and the poor suburbs of the cities.

Crown of Castile
In the Crown of Castile, which included the Guadalquivir valley in present Andalusia, the situation was considerably different. Overall, the proportion of Moriscos is considered to be lower but more significantly, the majority of them were former Mudejar (Muslims) Christians who were highly integrated in mainstream society, had abandoned many of their distinguishing cultural traits and crucially, unlike in Valencia, they did not suffer from hostility from their old-Christian neighbours, many of whom actively protected them from attempts by the Crown to expel them, to the point that in Plasencia the Crown officials sent to deport the Moriscos were immediately jailed upon arrival and in Avila the local Moriscos were integrated in the clergy and government positions to avoid expulsion.

At the time however, an additional Morisco community co-existed with these Mudejar Moriscos: a large number of Granada Moriscos who had been deported or dispersed after the uprising and war of the Alpujarras, who were the target of more suspicion within the communities in which they settled. Local sympathies for Moriscos meant that Castile and Andalusia experienced only half-hearted efforts at identifying and expelling them. The expulsion was slower and a far less thorough process than in the Crown of Aragon and particularly Valencia and a significant portion of Moriscos – according to Dadson a majority – either avoided expulsion or returned in the years following expulsion.

Crown of Aragon
In the Kingdom of Valencia, which held the bulk of the Morisco population in the Crown of Aragón, the situation was radically different to Castile. Valencian Moriscos were the overwhelming majority of the landless peasantry and lived segregated from Christian populations. Economic and social rivalry was a major driver of resentment towards them, particularly from the Middle classes of artisans. This had boiled over before in 1520, when in the Revolt of the Brotherhoods, the artisan guilds of Valencia revolted against both the landed aristocracy and the Muslim mudéjar peasantry. Although the rebellion was ultimately defeated in 1523, the rebels killed many, and forced the mass baptism and conversion of the remainder of the Muslim population. In 1525, these forced conversions were upheld by King Charles, thus creating the Moriscos of Valencia. The plight of the Valencian Moriscos was the worst during the expulsion due to the long-standing hostility of their Christian neighbors.

There was practically universal agreement in Spain that Islam was a threat that should be crushed. However, it was not clear how that should apply to the Moriscos, who were officially Christian. Some clerics such as Fray Luis de Aliaga, a royal councilor, supported giving time to the Moriscos to assimilate and become full Christians. This option was lightly supported by the Catholic Church in Rome, too. The most dedicated defenders of the Moriscos were the Valencian and Aragonese nobility, as their self-interest was involved. These nobles benefited the most from the poor and cheap workforce that the Moriscos provided.

Opposing this view were a variety of notables and classes of people. Clerics against Aliaga included Jaime Bleda, the most prominent member of the Inquisition in Valencia. Bleda made several early proposals to King Philip III to banish or otherwise end the Morisco problem; he even recommended genocide. At first, these entreaties were without success. In 1596 the Duke of Lerma, King Philip III's chief financial officer, accused the Moriscos of collaboration with the Muslim Barbary pirates, a charge that had dogged them for years. Still, while many in the population held to this, others considered that this threat had long since passed. The Council of Aragon, in opposing any punitive measures, wrote that even if they wished to betray Spain, the Moriscos were in no position to do so "for they possess no arms, nor supplies, nor fortified positions, nor a base for the Turkish fleet." Nothing came of it at the time, but the Duke of Lerma continued his antipathy toward the Moriscos.

Edict and expulsion

The Duke of Lerma eventually convinced King Philip III with the help of the Archbishop of Valencia, Juan de Ribera, who considered the Moriscos as universally heretics and traitors. The archbishop added an idea to make the plan more persuasive to the king: the king could confiscate the assets and properties of the Moorish population, thereby providing a dramatic one-time boost to the royal coffers. Ribera also encouraged the king to enslave the Moriscos for work in galleys, mines, and abroad as he could do so "without any scruples of conscience," but this proposal was rejected.

On April 9, 1609, the edict was signed to expel the Moriscos. The government knew that exiling so many would be problematic. It was decided to start with Valencia, where the Morisco population was greatest. Preparations were taken in the strictest secrecy. Starting in September, tercio battalions arrived from Italy. They took up positions in the main ports of Valencia: Alfaques, Dénia, and Alicante. On September 22, the viceroy ordered the publication of the decree. The Valencian aristocracy met with the government to protest the expulsion, as losing their workers would ruin their agricultural incomes. The government offered some of the confiscated property and territory of the Moriscos to them in exchange, but this didn't come close to compensating for the loss. The Moriscos would be allowed to take anything they could carry, but their homes and land would pass into the hands of their masters. Burning or other destruction of their homes before the transfer was prohibited on pain of death.

Certain exceptions were granted: six families out of every 100 would be allowed to stay behind and maintain the infrastructure of towns that had been predominantly Morisco-inhabited. Very few took advantage of this, considering that it was thought likely that they would still be exiled later. Additionally, the exile was optional for children less than four years old. This was later expanded to 16 years of age. Archbishop Ribera strongly opposed this part of the measure; he lobbied that at the very least the children should be separated from their parents, enslaved, and Christianized "for the good of their souls."

On September 30, the first of the exiles were taken to the ports, where, as a last insult, they were forced to pay their own fare for the trip. The Moriscos were transported to North Africa, where at times they were attacked as invaders by the people of the recipient countries. Other times, small revolts broke out on the ships, causing some of the exiles to be slain in battle with the crew. This caused fears in the Morisco population remaining in Valencia, and on October 20 there was a rebellion against the expulsion. The rebels numbered 6,000 and held the remote valley of Ayora and Muela de Cortes. Five days later, a new rebellion broke out on the southern coast, with 15,000 rebels holding the Valley of Lugar.

The rebels were defeated by November. In only three months, 116,000 Moriscos had been transported to North Africa from Valencia. The start of 1610 saw the expulsion of the Moriscos of Aragon (the specific area of Aragon, not all the lands of the old Crown of Aragon); 41,952 were sent to North Africa via Alfaques, and 13,470 were sent over the Pyrenees Mountains to France. The exasperated French sent most of them to the port of Agde, and those who took the land route were charged both the transit fee and the sea fare. In September, the Moriscos of Catalonia were exiled. Andalusia exiled some 32,000 Moriscos as well.

The expulsion of the Moriscos of Castile, Extremadura and Andalusia (then all part of the Crown of Castile) was the most difficult task, since they were dispersed across the land after being broken in 1571 by the rebellion rather than being concentrated in any one place. Because of this, the Moriscos were given a first option of voluntary departure, where they could take their most valuable possessions and anything else that might sell. Thus, in Castile the expulsion lasted three years, from 1611 to 1614.

Numbers and success of the expulsion
It is very difficult to gauge the success of the expulsion in purging Spain of its Morisco population, a topic which has been recently subject to academic reassessment. Even estimates of the number of Moriscos present in Spain prior to expulsion vary, ranging from numbers based on records of expulsion orders, such as those of Lynch and Lapeyre, (around 300,000) to more recent estimates of up to one million.

Equally, traditional Spanish historiography, and early studies which drew heavily from it, paint a picture of a well-run affair that succeeded in channeling the vast majority of Moriscos (around 270,000) out of the country in a short period of time. As a result, early estimates of Moriscos who succeeded in remaining in the country after the expulsion were as low as 15,000. 

However, a number of recent investigative studies have challenged the traditional discourse on the supposed success of the expulsion in purging Spain of its Morisco population. A number of modern studies have concluded that expulsion met widely differing levels of success, particularly within the two major Spanish crowns of Castile and Aragon. One of the earliest anglophone re-examinations of Morisco expulsion was carried out by Trevor J. Dadson in 2007. Dadson estimated that as much as 40% of Moriscos (around 200,000) never left the country, and up to 70,000 of those expelled managed to return. A significant section of his work is devoted to the example of Villarubia de los Ojos in southern Castile. The Morisco population of this town, who may not have been authentic Moriscos but who had been classified as Moriscos to appropriate their property, was the target of three expulsions which they managed to avoid or from which they succeeded in returning from to their town of origin, being protected and hidden by their non-Morisco neighbours. Dadson provides numerous examples, of similar incidents throughout Spain whereby Moriscos were protected and supported by non-Moriscos and returned en masse from North Africa, Portugal or France to their towns of origin.

A similar study on the expulsion in Andalusia concluded it was an inefficient operation which was significantly reduced in its severity by resistance to the measure from local authorities and populations. It further highlights the constant flow of returnees from North Africa, creating a dilemma for the local inquisition who did not know how to deal with those who had been given no choice but to convert to Islam during their stay in Muslim lands as a result of the Royal Decree. Upon the coronation of Felipe IV, the new king gave the order to desist from attempting to impose measures on returnees and in September 1628 the Council of the Supreme Inquisition ordered inquisitors in Seville not to prosecute expelled Moriscos "unless they cause significant commotion."

An investigation published in 2012 sheds light on the thousands of Moriscos who remained in the province of Granada alone, surviving both the initial expulsion to other parts of Spain in 1571 and the final expulsion of 1604. These Moriscos managed to evade the royal decrees in various ways, thereafter hiding their true origin. More surprisingly, by the 17th and 18th centuries much of this group accumulated great wealth by controlling the silk trade and also holding about a hundred public offices. Most of these lineages were nevertheless completely assimilated over generations despite their practice of endogamy. A compact core of active crypto-Muslims was prosecuted by the Inquisition in 1727, receiving comparatively light sentences. These convicts kept alive their identity until the late 18th century.

Besides, many Moriscos of the Catalan Low Ebro were officially excluded from expulsion and remained in their villages and towns, as well as some other expelled who returned, given the fact that they were very well integrated into Catalan Christian society, unlike those in Aragon, Valencia and even the Moriscos of the Catalan Low Segre.

Expulsion of Moriscos and population genetics

Spain's Morisco population was the last population who self-identified and traced its roots to the various waves of Muslim conquerors from North Africa. Modern population genetics generally assume Moriscos to have had both significant Iberian and North African ancestry, even if, after centuries of presence and intermarriage in the Iberian peninsula they were unlikely to differ significantly in ethnic terms from the wider Spanish population. For this reason studies in population genetics, which aim to ascertain Morisco ancestry in modern populations, search for Iberian or European genetic markers among contemporary Morisco descendants in North Africa, and for North African genetic markers among modern day Spaniards.
A number of recent genetic studies demonstrated that the African influence on the Iberian Peninsula is, by far, more intense than in other European surrounding territories and populations. Approximately 5% of Spaniards have E-M81 Y-haplogroup, which is the characteristic haplogroup of North Africans or Berbers which is generally attributed to Islamic rule and settlement of the Iberian peninsula. Common North African genetic markers which are relatively high frequencies in the Iberian peninsula as compared to most of the European continent are Y-chromosome E1b1b1b1 (E-M81) and mtDNA Haplogroups L and U6. Studies coincide that North African admixture tends to increase in the South and West of the peninsula, peaking in parts of Andalusia, Extremadura and North West Castile. Distribution of North African markers are largely absent from the northeast of Spain as well as the Basque country. The uneven distribution of admixture in Spain has been explained by the extent and intensity of Islamic colonization in a given area, but also by the varying levels of success in attempting to expel the Moriscos in different regions of Spain, as well as forced and voluntary Morisco population movements during the 16th and 17th centuries.

As for tracing Morisco descendants in North Africa, to date there have been few genetic studies of populations of Morisco origin in the Maghreb region, although studies of the Moroccan population have not detected significant recent genetic inflow from the Iberian peninsula. A recent study of various Tunisian ethnic groups has found that all were indigenous North African, including those who self-identified as Andalusians.

Consequences
The Council of Castile evaluated the expulsion in 1619 and concluded that it had no economic impact for the country. This was basically true for Castile, as some scholars of the expulsion have found no economic consequences on sectors where the Morisco population was important. However, in the Kingdom of Valencia, fields were abandoned and a vacuum was left in sectors of the economy the native Christians could not possibly fill. With the removal by 33% of the inhabitants of the Kingdom of Valencia, some counties in the north of the current Alicante province lost virtually their entire population. The infrastructure decayed, and the Christian nobles and landlords fell into arrears. Strapped for cash, many of the Valencian nobles increased rents on their Christian tenants to get even close to their previous income. The increase in rents drove off any new tenants from coming to replace them, and as a result agricultural output in Valencia dropped greatly.

The expulsion was a crippling blow not just to the economies of Aragon and Valencia, but also to the power of their nobles. The former Crown of Aragon had been in the shadow of the richer and more populous Crown of Castile for some time, but with this, their stature dropped still further. Of the eastern kingdoms themselves, the Catalan nobles now rose to prominence, their incomes far less affected since, unlike their southern and western neighbours, they never had a significant Morisco population. Thus the expulsion helped shift power away from its traditional centers in Valencia to the Principality of Catalonia within the Crown of Aragon.

Modern initiatives
In reaction to the policy of Spain to facilitate access to Spanish citizenship by descendants of the Jews who were expelled from Spain, there has been demand from Muslims to apply a similar policy to the descendants of the Moriscos. In 2006 this demand received support from the parliament of Andalusia but has not gained broader support.

See also
 Persecution of Muslims
 Treaty of Granada (1491)
 Alhambra Decree
 Edict of Expulsion
 Edict of Fontainebleau
 1731 Expulsion of Protestants from Salzburg
 Republic of Salé

References

Bibliography
 
 

17th century in Spain
Economic history of Spain
1609 in Europe
Moriscos
Crypto-Islam
Religious expulsion orders
Ethnic cleansing in Europe
Settlement schemes in Spain